Schiner or Schinner is a Germanic surname that may refer to
Augustine Francis Schinner (1863–1937), American prelate of the Roman Catholic Church
Ignaz Rudolph Schiner (1813–1873) Austrian entomologist 
Matthäus Schiner (or Schinner, c.1465–1522), Swiss bishop of Sion, Cardinal and diplomat

German-language surnames